Charlie Wakim (born 9 July 1991) is an Australian cricketer. He made his List A debut for Tasmania in the 2017–18 JLT One-Day Cup on 2 October 2017. In September 2018, he was named in the Hobart Hurricanes' squad for the 2018 Abu Dhabi T20 Trophy. He made his Twenty20 debut for the Hobart Hurricanes in the 2018 Abu Dhabi T20 Trophy on 5 October 2018. He made his first-class debut for Tasmania in the 2018–19 Sheffield Shield season on 23 February 2019.

Wakim was called up to play for the Melbourne Stars against the Perth Scorchers at the Junction Oval on 2 January 2022, being brought into the squad for the 2021–22 Big Bash after several members of the original squad became unavailable due to illness.

References

External links
 

1991 births
Living people
Australian cricketers
Place of birth missing (living people)
Hobart Hurricanes cricketers
Tasmania cricketers
Melbourne Stars cricketers